Gor Manukyan (born 27 September 1993) is an Armenian international footballer who plays for Alashkert, as a goalkeeper.

Career

Club
On 19 August 2019, Manukyan was released by FC Pyunik, signing for FC Alashkert on 26 August 2019.

Career statistics

Club

International

Statistics accurate as of match played 27 March 2018

References

1993 births
Living people
Armenian footballers
Armenia international footballers
FC Pyunik players
Armenian Premier League players
Association football goalkeepers